Colby College overlooks the Kennebec River valley and city of Waterville.

In 2013 Colby became the fourth college in the country to achieve carbon neutrality. Colby uses 100-percent renewable electricity, has 12 LEED-certified buildings (other certifications pending), has geothermal heating and cooling in two buildings, and has a biomass plant that burns sustainably harvested wood to heat most campus buildings.

Academic buildings

Student life buildings

Administrative and support buildings

Residential buildings

Hillside
Designed by Benjamin C. Thompson, the Hillside complex is a network of five interconnected dorms west of Lorimer Chapel set in a stand of white birch and pine trees. Hillside halls have a lounge on every floor.

The Quad

Roberts Row
On Alumni Weekend (June 8, 1985), the buildings of "Fraternity Row" were rededicated and renamed with recommendations of their former occupants.

Other campus facilities

Original campus

References

Further reading

External links 

Colby College
Colby College
Colby College